Buried Inside was a Canadian band from Ottawa, Ontario.

History

Buried Inside was formed in 1997, influenced by early metalcore and hardcore punk bands Acme, One Eyed God Prophecy, Drift, and Union of Uranus. Their sound included distorted vocals, creatively timed drumming, heavy use of octave double stops (which created a melodic effect), and occasional sampling of gloomy film dialogue or instruments such as the cello. After releasing two independent albums, in 2005 they signed to Relapse Records and put out their "concept" album, Chronoclast. That year the band toured North America with Eye-HateGod and Byzantine.

In 2009 they released their fourth album, Spoils of Failure. They played their final show on November 13, 2010.

Members

Final line-up
Andrew Tweedy – guitar, vocals
Nick Shaw – vocals
Mike Godbout – drums
Steve Martin – bass, vocals

Past members
Matias Palacios-Hardy – guitar (1997–2005, 2009–2010)
Emmanuel Sayer – guitar (2005–2009)

Discography
In and of the Self (1999, Matlock Records)
Suspect Symmetry (2001, Cyclop Media)
Chronoclast (2005, Relapse Records, Init records)
Spoils of Failure (2009, Relapse Records)

References

External links
Relapse Records band profile
Buried Inside on MySpace
[ Buried Inside] at AllMusic

Musical groups from Ottawa
Canadian post-hardcore musical groups
Relapse Records artists
Canadian metalcore musical groups
Musical groups established in 1997
Musical groups disestablished in 2010
1997 establishments in Ontario
2010 disestablishments in Ontario